The drug udenafil is marketed under the trade name Zydena. It is within the PDE5 inhibitor class (which also includes avanafil, sildenafil, tadalafil, and vardenafil).  Like other PDE5 inhibitors, it is used to treat erectile dysfunction. Udenafil was developed by Dong-A Pharmaceutical. It has fairly rapid onset of action (peak plasma concentration after 1 to 1.5 hours), and has long duration of action (plasma half-life of 11 to 13 hours). Udenafil's pharmacokinetics allows once-daily dosage (in addition to on-demand use). Typical doses are 100 and 200 mg. Udenafil is available in Korea, Russia, and the Philippines. It has not yet been approved for use in the United States by the U.S. Food and Drug Administration.

References 

Lactams
PDE5 inhibitors
Phenol ethers
Pyrazolopyrimidines
Pyrrolidines
Sulfonamides